Fredskapellet is a chapel of the Church of Norway in Narvik Municipality in Nordland county, Norway. It is located in the town of Narvik. It is an annex chapel in the Narvik parish which is part of the Ofoten prosti (deanery) in the Diocese of Sør-Hålogaland. The brick chapel was built in a long church style in 1957 using plans drawn up by the architect Jan Inge Hovig. The chapel seats about 250 people.

History
The first chapel built on this site was completed in 1939 and it was consecrated on 23 March 1939. The chapel was destroyed during World War II in April 1940, about a year after it was completed. The chapel was rebuilt after the war and it was consecrated on 14 December 1957 by the Bishop Wollert Krohn-Hansen. The chapel is located next to the main cemetery for the town of Narvik and therefore the chapel is mostly used for funerals.

Media gallery

See also
List of churches in Sør-Hålogaland

References

Narvik
Churches in Nordland
Brick churches in Norway
20th-century Church of Norway church buildings
Churches completed in 1957
1939 establishments in Norway
Long churches in Norway